Acheh Soltan Qajar was a Turkoman military officer from the Qajar tribe, who served as the Safavid governor of Urfa (also known as Orfah, Orufah, or Orufah-ye Diyarbekr) from 1514 to 1517.

On his appointment as governor, Acheh Soltan was given the honorary name Qadurmish Khan, as he had been responsible for killing Morad Mirza of the Ak Koyunlu, Ismail I's rival. 

Acheh Soltan Qajar is apparently one of only two attested individuals from the Qajar tribe (the other one being Piri Beg Qajar) who held stature during the reign of Ismail I. Nevertheless, neither Acheh Soltan nor Piri Beg were leading amirs "in the sense of holding high office in the early Safavid administration".

References

Sources
 
 

15th-century births
16th-century deaths
History of Şanlıurfa
Safavid governors
Iranian Turkmen people
Safavid military officers
Qajar tribe
16th-century people of Safavid Iran